John Philip Morgan (by 1524 – will proved 1559), of Skenfrith, Monmouthshire, was a Welsh politician.

He was a Member (MP) of the Parliament of England for Monmouth Boroughs from 1553 to 1554.

References

1550s deaths
16th-century Welsh politicians
People from Monmouthshire
Year of birth uncertain
English MPs 1553 (Mary I)
English MPs 1554
English MPs 1554–1555